Harold "Hank" P. Naughton Jr. is an American politician. He is a state legislator who has served in the Massachusetts House of Representatives since 1995.  He was born in Worcester, MA on July 4, 1960 and grew up in Clinton, MA, where he still resides with his wife, Ellen, and four children.  He is a member of the Democratic Party.

Naughton is a Lt. Col. in the Army Reserves.  He has served as an Army JAG in both Iraq and Afghanistan where he saw combat.   He has been awarded the Combat Action Badge, among other military awards.

On October 24, 2013, Naughton announced his candidacy for Attorney General of Massachusetts. He  dropped out of the race in March 2014 and ran for reelection to the House instead. He is not running for reelection to a fourteenth term in 2020.

Education and Legal Career 
Naughton attended public schools in Clinton, MA and went on to earn his Bachelor's at Assumption College in 1982.  He earned his Juris Doctor from Suffolk University School of Law in Boston and also studied at Notre Dame Law School in London, England.

Naughton began his legal career as an Assistant District Attorney in Worcester County where he served from 1992 to 1995.  Since 1995, he has practiced law at Naughton Law Firm in Clinton, MA.  His firm concentrates on litigation, criminal defense, local, national and international development issues, and government relations.

In the early 2000s, Rep. Naughton accompanied former President Clinton to Northern Ireland in conjunction with the founding of the Enniskillen Peace Center.  Naughton was also an observer at the Saville Investigation Hearings into the "Bloody Sunday" shootings of unarmed civilian civil rights protesters by British troops.

Hank Naughton joined the plaintiff litigation firm Napoli Shkolnik PLLC full time in August 2020. He focuses on PFAS and Environmental Litigation and Veterans Advocacy.

Massachusetts House of Representatives 

Naughton was first elected to the Massachusetts House of Representatives in 1995 and has since served in the legislature for 24 years.

From 2008-2012, he served as the House Chairman of the Committee on Veterans and Federal Affairs.  Naughton was also Chairman of the Judiciary Sub-Committee on Drug Courts and the Supreme Judicial Court Standing Committee on Substance Abuse in the Courts.

Since 2010, Rep. Naughton has served as House Chairman of the Joint Committee on Public Safety and Homeland Security. 
As Chairman, he is currently focusing the Committee's legislative priorities on removing illegal guns from the streets of the Commonwealth.

His legislative priorities include local affairs, education, the environment, veteran's affairs, and constituent outreach.  He is an advisory member of the Governor's Commission on Veterans and Military Family Support and a former member of the Democratic National Committee Coordinating Council on Veterans and Military Families.

In April 2020, he announced that he will not seek a fourteenth term that year.

Military service 
Following the events of September 11, 2001, Naughton joined the United States Army Reserve.  He currently serves as a Major with the Judge Advocate General's Corps.  Naughton volunteered for a tour of active duty and served with Multi-National Force Iraq from September, 2005 until May, 2006.  At the end of May, 2012, he returned from an 8-month voluntary deployment to Kandahar, Afghanistan with the 2nd Brigade Combat Team, 4th Infantry Division.

As an Army JAG, Naughton worked with local Afghan judicial authorities, military, and security forces, in conjunction with officials from the United Nations, State Department, Red Cross, and other entities, to establish a sustainable judicial and law enforcement system in the City of Kandahar and the greater Kandahar Province in southern Afghanistan.

Major Naughton currently serves with the Third Legal Operational Detachment and acts as an adjunct to the Defense Security Cooperation Agency and the Defense Institute of International Legal Studies.  He has traveled to the Democratic Republic of the Congo, where he has advised the Congolese Army on ethics and anti-corruption.

He has been awarded the Combat Action Badge, Bronze Star Medal, Meritorious Service Medal, Afghan Campaign Medal with Campaign Star, Iraq Campaign Medal with Campaign Star, Army Commendation Medal (2nd Award), Army Achievement Medal, Army Reserve Components Achievement Medal (2nd Award), National Defense Service Medal, Global War on Terrorism Expeditionary Medal, NATO Medal, Army Service Ribbon, Overseas Service Ribbon, Armed Forces Reserve Medal with M/Device, and Military Outstanding Volunteer Service Medal.

In May, 2011, former United States Secretary of State Hillary Clinton appointed Representative Naughton to the International Security Advisory Board.  United States Secretary of State John Kerry has since reappointed him to the board.

Other 
Naughton has been a commentator on the National ‘Fox and Friends’ Morning television show in regards to the Afghanistan War.  He has also made appearances on WGBH, Fox 25, WBZ-TV  Channel 4,WBZ Radio 1030, WTKK Radio 96.9, WBUR 90.9 National Public Radio, and NBC’s Today Show.

See also
 2019–2020 Massachusetts legislature

References

External links 
 Representative Harold P. Naughton, Jr. profile page on malegislature.gov
 Representative Naughton personal website
 Harold Naughton Jr. profile page on ballotpedia.org

Living people
Democratic Party members of the Massachusetts House of Representatives
People from Clinton, Massachusetts
1960 births
21st-century American politicians